Queenstown-Lakes District, a local government district, is in the Otago Region of New Zealand that was formed in 1986. It is surrounded by the districts of Central Otago, Southland, Westland and Waitaki.

Much of the area is often referred to as Queenstown because of the popularity of the resort town, but the district covers a much wider area, including the towns of Wānaka to the north-east, Glenorchy to the north-west and Kingston to the south.

The district is sometimes called the Southern Lakes, as it contains Lake Wakatipu, Lake Wānaka and Lake Hāwea.

Local government
The Queenstown Borough Council was constituted in 1866. In 1986, Queenstown Borough Council merged with Lake County to form Queenstown-Lakes District Council. In 1989, Arrowtown Borough Council amalgamated with Queenstown-Lakes District Council in the 1989 local government reforms.

The district is administered by the Queenstown Lakes District Council (QLDC) and regionally by the Otago Regional Council.

The Queenstown Lakes District is expected to grow faster than Auckland over the period 2006-31. Statistics New Zealand projections show the district shares the highest growth rate in New Zealand of 2.2% a year with the Selwyn District.

Demographics

Queenstown-Lakes District had a population of 39,153 at the 2018 New Zealand census, an increase of 10,929 people (38.7%) since the 2013 census, and an increase of 16,194 people (70.5%) since the 2006 census. There were 13,176 households. There were 19,971 males and 19,182 females, giving a sex ratio of 1.04 males per female. The median age was 34.4 years (compared with 37.4 years nationally), with 6,522 people (16.7%) aged under 15 years, 9,195 (23.5%) aged 15 to 29, 19,317 (49.3%) aged 30 to 64, and 4,119 (10.5%) aged 65 or older.

Ethnicities were 83.6% European/Pākehā, 5.3% Māori, 1.0% Pacific peoples, 9.9% Asian, and 5.9% other ethnicities. People may identify with more than one ethnicity. At 5.3%, the Queenstown-Lakes District has the lowest proportion of Māori people of all territorial authorities in New Zealand.

The percentage of people born overseas was 39.9, compared with 27.1% nationally.

Although some people objected to giving their religion, 61.2% had no religion, 29.1% were Christian, 1.6% were Hindu, 0.4% were Muslim, 1.0% were Buddhist and 2.4% had other religions.

Of those at least 15 years old, 9,312 (28.5%) people had a bachelor or higher degree, and 2,493 (7.6%) people had no formal qualifications. The median income was $40,600, compared with $31,800 nationally. 6,495 people (19.9%) earned over $70,000 compared to 17.2% nationally. The employment status of those at least 15 was that 21,660 (66.4%) people were employed full-time, 4,629 (14.2%) were part-time, and 354 (1.1%) were unemployed.

Urban areas and settlements 
The Queenstown-Lakes District has six towns with a population over 1,000. Together they are home to % of the district's population.

See also
 Southern Lakes (New Zealand)

References

External links

 Queenstown-Lakes District Council